American pondweed is a common name for several aquatic plants, and may refer to:

Elodea canadensis, in the family Hydrocharitaceae, with many small leaves on a submerged stem
Potamogeton epihydrus, in the family Potamogetonaceae, and known as "American pondweed" in the British Isles
Potamogeton nodosus, in the family Potamogetonaceae, with large floating leaves born on elongated petioles